Joakim Marković (c. 1685–1757) was an Austrian Serb painter who worked in Old Slavonia.

He painted the iconostasis of two bishopric churches in Pakrac and Severin County, and in St. Thomas Church in Dišnik (now Garesnica in the Bjelovar-Bilogora County). Artistically and historically Marković's most interesting iconostasis is the memorial church built by a Serbian military border officer, Baron Mihailo Mikašinović in Plavšinac.

In Plavšinac, Joakim Marković painted two compositions in 1750, one showing the privileges bestowed by Byzantine emperor Basil II on the Serbs and Croats - the privilege of establishing themselves in his dominion. That painting is now in Zagreb. The second Marković's painting shows the Austrian monarch Rudolf II with Serbs. These paintings are considered the first historical compositions in our recent art.

Marković painted primarily religious-themed icons and frescoes. He did frescoes for the Metropolitanate of Karlovci in the church monasteries throughout Fruška Gora. He later returned to Buda where he continued to work until he died in 1757.

See also
 List of painters from Serbia

References 

18th-century Serbian painters
18th-century male artists
1680s births
1757 deaths
People from Slavonia